Ernest Pynor (23 April 1920 – 23 October 1999) was an Australian cricketer. He played in three first-class matches for South Australia between 1948 and 1950.

See also
 List of South Australian representative cricketers

References

External links
 

1920 births
1999 deaths
Australian cricketers
South Australia cricketers
People from Essendon, Victoria